Aloinopsis rubrolineata is a species of succulent plant in the genus Aloinopsis native to South Africa. It grows in a branching habit low to the ground, and has leaves covered with small, round tubercles. The leaves are dark olive green and tongue-like in shape. Its scientific name refers to its flowers, which have a distinctive red stripe.

References

rubrolineata
Plants described in 1926